Jacques Toussele was a Cameroonian photographer from Bamessingué near Mbouda in the Western Region of Cameroon.

There are several variant spelling of his Bamiléké name: Toussile, Tousellé, Tousselle and Touselle are all attested. The spelling on his identity card is Toussele without an accent (but pronounced in the French fashion <Tousselé>, phonetically [tus sεlε]). When his work was exhibited at the Pitt Rivers Museum, an accented variant of his name was used.

Early life 
Jacques Toussele was born in 1939 at Bamensingue.

Career 
The first Mbouda-born photographer working in Mbouda, he was taught photography by a Nigerian-born photographer. He worked in Bamenda at the height of the troubles but then returned to Mbouda where he worked since mid 1960s until his eventual retirement in the early 2000s. He died in Douala on Friday 30 June 2017.

Notable achievements 
His work is in the collection of the Metropolitan Museum of Art, New York and Carleton College and is included in an exhibition at the Fowler Museum, Los Angeles opening late 2017.

A small exhibition of his work was held at the Pitt Rivers Museum, Oxford curated by Philip Grover & Chris Morton "Studio Cameroon: the everyday photography of Jacques Toussellé". 9 Nov 2007–29 July 2008.

His work was the subject of a major archiving project as part of the British Library’s Endangered Archive Programme. Scanned copies of his work is available online via the BL link. His work is included in a major exhibition at the Fowler Museum at UCLA in the second half of 2021: See https://www.fowler.ucla.edu/exhibitions/photo-cameroon/.

Examples

References 

1939 births
Cameroonian photographers
2017 deaths